EUFC may refer to:

Ebbsfleet United F.C.
Eccleshill United F.C.
Echuca United Football Club
Evergreen United F.C.
Evesham United F.C.